The 2016–17 Columbia Lions women's basketball team represented Columbia University during the 2016–17 NCAA Division I women's basketball season. The Lions, led by first-year head coach Megan Griffith, played their home games at Levien Gymnasium and were members of the Ivy League. They finished the season 13–14, 3–11 in Ivy League play to finish in a tie for seventh place. They failed to qualify for the Ivy women's tournament, new this year.

Ivy League changes
This season, the Ivy League will institute conference postseason tournaments. The tournaments will only award the Ivy League automatic bids for the NCAA Division I Men's and Women's Basketball Tournaments; the official conference championships will continue to be awarded based solely on regular-season results. The Ivy League playoff will take place March 11 and 12 at the Palestra in Philadelphia. There will be two semifinal games on the first day with the No. 1 seed playing the No. 4 seed and the No. 2 seed playing the No. 3 seed. The final will be played the next day for the NCAA bid.

Roster

Schedule

|-
!colspan=9 style="background:#75b2dd; color:#FFFFFF;"| Non-conference regular season

|-
!colspan=9 style="background:#75b2dd; color:#FFFFFF;"| Ivy League regular season

See also
 2016–17 Columbia Lions men's basketball team

References

Columbia Lions women's basketball seasons
Columbia
Columbia
Columbia